Zhou Yubo is a Chinese sprint canoeist.  At the 2012 Summer Olympics, he competed in the Men's K-1 200 metres, and Men's K-1 1000 metres.

References

Chinese male canoeists
Year of birth missing (living people)
Living people
Olympic canoeists of China
Canoeists at the 2012 Summer Olympics